Fred Records is a British independent record label created in 2002 by the English guitarist, composer and improvisor Fred Frith to re-release his own back catalogue of recordings and previously unreleased material. It is an independent company working in co-operation with Chris Cutler and Recommended Records, utilising Recommended Records' distribution network.

Background
From the mid-1980s, Frith released much of his music (solo and in collaboration with other musicians) on the Swiss independent record label RecRec Music. However, the label went bankrupt in 1997 after its founder, Daniel Waldner died in a mountaineering accident in 1995. Under Swiss copyright law all the rights to Frith's music released by RecRec reverted to him, totalling 13 different titles. Having lost money in unpaid royalties, Frith wanted to re-release all the titles on a single label. In the early 2000s, and with the help of Chris Cutler of Recommended Records, Frith set up his own label, Fred Records as an imprint of Recommended Records.

The new label gave Frith an opportunity to re-issue material from his archives that would have been difficult to release elsewhere. Advances in technology also enabled him to remaster the original recordings and to produce a sound much closer to what was originally intended. In addition, Frith has released previously unreleased material by himself and in collaboration with other musicians. To create a consistent image for the label as a whole, Frith has used the artist,  to illustrate the CD covers, often incorporating elements of the original LP covers in the design.

Tributaries
Currently, the Fred Records catalogue is divided into three tributaries:
FRO (Fred Records Original) – re-releases of Frith's previously released original material
FRA (Fred Records Archive) – releases of previously unreleased material from Frith's archive
FRFC (Fred Records French Connection) – releases of previously unreleased material from Frith's archive recorded in France.
The catalogue numbers of each release include one of these tributary codes. For example, "RēR/FRA 02" reads "Recommended Records / Fred Records Archive #2".

Releases
These are all the titles currently released on the Fred Records label.

See also
List of record labels
List of independent UK record labels

Notes

References

External links
Fred Frith home page.
Fred Records
RēR Megacorp. Recommended Records UK.
Locus Solus. Recommended Records Japan.
RēR USA. Recommended Records USA.

British independent record labels
Record labels established in 2002
Alternative rock record labels
Experimental music record labels
Fred Frith
2002 establishments in the United Kingdom